Backshot may refer to:

Water wheel#Backshot wheel
Backshot (StarFist novel), a novel by David Sherman and Dan Cragg
Backshot, novel by George G. Gilman